The USB Flash Drive Alliance, founded in December 2003 by
Samsung, Lexar Media, Kingston Technology and others, is a group of companies promoting the use of USB flash drives (also called "keydrives" and a variety of other names).

In 2003, according to the alliance, 50 million USB flash drives were sold in the US alone.

Alliance members 
Buffalo Technology
Corsair Gaming
Crucial Technology
Infineon Technologies
Kingston Technology
Lexar Media
Microsoft
Phison
PNY Technologies
Samsung
SimpleTech

See also
USB
USB flash drive
U3 USB "smart" drives

References

Technology trade associations